Hart's Turkey Farm is a restaurant in Meredith, New Hampshire in the United States. The restaurant, which opened in 1954, has a large menu showcasing turkey dishes.

History

In 1946, brothers Larry and Russ Hart, and wives Helen and Gerda, moved to the Lakes Region of New Hampshire from the New Jersey suburbs. The Hart family vacationed in the Lakes Region since the 1920s. They started a farm. They sold produce and meat out of a truck, including chicken, turkey, fruit and vegetables. 

By 1953, the Hart family started only raising turkeys. In 1954, they opened a small restaurant that seated twelve in Meredith, New Hampshire. The restaurant served turkey sandwiches and dinners with Hart's Turkey Farm turkey. Larry died in 1960 and Russ became the sole owner of the farm and restaurant. By 1965, Russ Hart quit farming to expand and operate the restaurant full time. He decided to source turkeys from other farms using strict standards.

Lynn, Dale, Russell T., and Glenn Hart - the children of Russ and Helen - purchased the restaurant in 1986. Today, the restaurant Hart family member Sam Wiley.

The restaurant opened a second location in Manchester, New Hampshire in 2008. The second location was temporarily closed for renovations as of 2011. Mitt Romney visited the Meredith location during the 2012 presidential election. As of 2021, the second location is permanently closed. In 2014, Hart's hosted a tourism industry open house for its 60th anniversary. Over 600 people attended. In 2018, a tanker truck rolled over in front of the restaurant, causing minor damage to the building.

During the summer, the restaurant has 230 employees. Due to the economic impact of the COVID-19 pandemic, the restaurant was approximately 100 employees short in 2021. To support workers, Willey owns two apartment buildings and provides employees reduced rent.

Hart's sponsors an annual Thanksgiving dinner providing complimentary meals for families and individuals in need or celebrating the holiday alone. They also operate a catering company. Katharine Hepburn and Caroline Kennedy have dined at the original Hart's Turkey Farm.

Restaurant design and style

Hart's Turkey Farm is a large white building surrounded by parking lots. The entrance has a gift shop. In 2011, ABC News' Larry Olmstead described the restaurant as having "a bit of a truck stop feel" and a "practical New England feel." The restaurant is broken up into multiple dining rooms, which, combined, can seat over 500 individuals. The rooms have wood paneled walls and each room has a collection of plates and dishes with turkey motif on display. There are over 1,000 platters in the collection, which was started by Mae Hart. The restaurant also includes a bar and bakery.

Cuisine

The restaurant used to sell dishes made with Hart's Turkey Farm turkeys. Today, they source turkeys from other farms, with their biggest supplier being from Utah. The large menu has numerous turkey-centric dishes on it.

Hart's most popular meal is a Thanksgiving-style meal which is offered daily. The meal includes roasted turkey served in three portion sizes, with over a pound being the largest portion. The price, as of 2014, was $22.95, including sides. A turkey drumstick dinner is also available. As of 2011, it was $10.99. 

They also sell turkey sandwiches, including turkey meatball sandwiches, a "Turkey Gobbler" sandwich topped with stuffing, cranberry sauce and mayo, and a turkey Rueben. They also serve turkey variations on chicken divan, chicken alfredo, and cheesesteaks. The restaurant also sells appetizers including croquette made of turkey, turkey nuggets, potstickers filled with turkey, turkey quesadillas, turkey soup, tempura turkey, and sauteed turkey liver with onion, cranberry relish and mushrooms. 

Non-turkey dishes include hamburgers and pastas. They also sell fried clams and lobster rolls during the summer. Hart's makes their own salad dressing, mashed potatoes, chowders, and relish made with carrot. They also make their own ice cream. The cranberry sauce is from a can.

As of 2011, the restaurant sold over a ton of turkey, 1,000 pounds of potatoes, 4,000 bread rolls, 40 gallons of gravy, and 1,000 pies daily. In 2021, the restaurant sold an average of 100 40-pound turkeys daily. On Thanksgiving Day, the restaurant sells 1,600 turkey dinners onsite and 180 dinners for take out.

Reception

In 2011, ABC News' Larry Olmstead described Hart's Turkey Farm as having "attentive friendly small-town service and the unique atmosphere" and having a "novelty." He called the food "quite good." He called the stuffing "very good", the mashed potatoes "rich and decadent" and the desserts "excellent." Local Dartmouth College administrator, Gregg Cerveny, called the restaurant "a New Hampshire institution." The restaurant has been featured on the Phantom Gourmet and the Travel Channel. The Michelin Guide has also profiled the restaurant.

References

External links

"Hart's Turkey Farm's Vintage Turkey Plate Collection" from New Hampshire magazine

Restaurants established in 1954
American companies established in 1953
1953 establishments in New Hampshire
1954 establishments in New Hampshire
Restaurants in New Hampshire
Poultry restaurants
Thanksgiving